Jefferson is an unincorporated community in Camden County, in the U.S. state of Georgia.

History
An old variant name is "Jeffersonton". Jefferson was platted in 1800 and once served as Camden County's county seat.

References

Unincorporated communities in Camden County, Georgia